Nanus is a genus of true weevils in the family of beetles known as Curculionidae. There are about six described species in Nanus.

Species
These six species belong to the genus Nanus:
 Nanus dentipes Wollaston, T.V., 1873 c
 Nanus erythrurus Hustache, A. in Gruvel, 1932 c
 Nanus hispidus Champion, G.C., 1909 c
 Nanus punctatellus Boheman, C.H. in Schönherr, C.J., 1844 c
 Nanus punctellus Boheman, 1844 c
 Nanus uniformis Boheman, 1844 i c b
Data sources: i = ITIS, c = Catalogue of Life, g = GBIF, b = Bugguide.net

References

Further reading

 
 
 

Molytinae
Articles created by Qbugbot